Finnish-Russian Chamber of Commerce (FRCC) is a non-profit organization, whose mission is to promote companies’ business and competitiveness as well as economic relations in Russia and Finland. FRCC offers companies various services in the fields of market research, company operation, export promotion, training, information, and consultation.

Description
FRCC works in all fields of business and serves all customers. However, members receive benefits denied to others: discounts on FRCC products and services, advantages in receiving information and promoting their business. Half of the FRCC clients are small and medium-sized companies, half larger, whose capital exceeds 840,000 euros. Two thirds of the FRCC members, on the other hand, are small and medium-sized companies.

The FRCC is a lobbying organization for its members. Through various working groups and projects the board members and the operative management seek to influence issues, which hinder the development of trade between the countries. FRCC receives its funding from several sources. Own funding, which includes membership fees, makes up over 80%, the Finnish Ministry of Trade and Industry subsidises the remaining 20%.

FRCC numbers (04/2010) almost 850 members, about 700 of which are Finnish and some 150 Russian. Finnish name of FRCC is Suomalais-Venäläinen kauppakamari (SVKK) and Russian Финско-Российская торговая палата (ФРТП).

See also
European Federation of Bilateral Chambers of Commerce

References

Foreign trade of Russia
Non-profit organisations based in Finland